Toter Mann (German for "dead man") may refer to:
 a German mining expression for an unproductive mineral vein (Mann)
 Erdanker Toter Mann, a fixing technology in firn and snow
 Toter Mann, German for the ball of coke that forms in the centre of a blast furnace
 Toter Mann, German for "back floating" a form of survival when swimming

Places
 Toter Mann (Warscheneck Group) (2,137 m), subpeak of the Warscheneck on the Pyhrn Pass in Upper Austria
 Toter Mann (Berchtesgaden Alps) (1,392 m), mountain near  Berchtesgaden, Bavaria
 Toter Mann (Black Forest) (1,321 m), mountain in the municipality of Oberried im Breisgau, well known mountain run
 Toter Mann (Kolomansberg), 874 m, mountain with Bildbaum am Kolomansberg, Salzburg state
 Toter Mann (Seulingswald), 480 m, hill near Friedewald, Hessen
 Le Mort Homme, a fiercely fought-over hill in the Battle of Verdun

Other uses
 Toter Mann (film), 2001 German TV thriller by Christian Petzold
 a 1989 crime story by Yaak Karsunke

See also
 Todtmann, Todter Mann
 Dead man (disambiguation)